Ervin W. Conradt (October 4, 1916 – November 5, 2001) was an American politician and farmer.

Born in Bovina, Wisconsin, Conradt was a farmer. He served in the Town of Bovina as a supervisor and chairman and also on the Outagamie County Board of Supervisors. Conradt was in the Wisconsin State Assembly from 1965 to 1981 as a Republican. Conradt then became Wisconsin State Highway Commissioner. From 1994 to 1996, Conradt was mayor of Seymour, Wisconsin. He died in Appleton, Wisconsin.

Notes

1916 births
2001 deaths
People from Bovina, Wisconsin
County supervisors in Wisconsin
Mayors of places in Wisconsin
Republican Party members of the Wisconsin State Assembly
20th-century American politicians
People from Seymour, Wisconsin